The Cumberland Electric Railway, now defunct, was an American railroad of western Maryland built in the 19th and 20th centuries.

Electric trolley service in Cumberland, Maryland started in 1891 with the inauguration of the Cumberland Electric Railway. The railway initially transported passengers along North Centre Street to Narrows Park for a fare of five cents. The Park included a soda fountain, dance and roller skating pavilion, and bandstand. In 1914, Kirkstetler Amusement leased the park to build an amusement park, that included a roller coaster, a merry-go-round, and a miniature railroad ride. In summer evenings the park was patronized by large crowds, and the trolley company expanded to meet the demand by adding extra, open sided cars to handle the traffic.

1891-1924 Cumberland Electric Railway 
1924-1932 Potomac Edison Co. (American Water Works & Electric Co.)
1893-???? Lonaconing and Cumberland Electric Railway 
????-???? Frostburg, Eckhart, and Cumberland Railway 
????-???? Lonaconing, Midland and Frostburg Railway
????-???? Westernport and Lonaconing Railway Company
1932 - streetcars discontinued in Cumberland

References 

Defunct Maryland railroads
Interurban railways in Maryland